The AFC Beach Soccer Asian Cup is the main championship for beach soccer in Asia, contested between the senior men's national teams of the members of the Asian Football Confederation (AFC). It is the sport's version of the better known AFC Asian Cup in association football.

The winners of the championship are crowned continental champions; the tournament also acts as the qualification route for Asian nations to the upcoming edition of the FIFA Beach Soccer World Cup. Coinciding with the annual staging of the World Cup, the competition took place yearly until 2009; the World Cup then became biennial, and as its supplementary qualification event, the championship followed suit.

The championship was established in 2006 after FIFA made it a requirement for all confederations to begin holding qualification tournaments to determine the best national team(s) in their region who would proceed to represent their continent in the upcoming World Cup (previously, nations were simply invited to play, without having to earn their place). FIFA currently allocate Asia three berths at the World Cup and hence top three teams qualify to the World Cup finals.

Asia's governing body for football, the AFC, organise the championship. However, it was not originally an AFC competition – it was created by Beach Soccer Worldwide (BSWW) under the title, FIFA Beach Soccer World Cup AFC qualifier; they organised the first six editions. During this time it also became informally known by the misnomer, the AFC Beach Soccer Championship. In 2015, the AFC adopted the competition and branded it using its informal title in an official capacity; they jointly organised that year's edition with BSWW. Since 2017, the AFC have been sole organisers. For 2021, the competition was renamed as the AFC Beach Soccer Asian Cup, bringing it in line with the naming of other AFC senior national tournaments.

Japan are the most successful nation with three titles and having also qualified for the World Cup on every occasion.

Results
For all tournaments, the top three teams qualified for the FIFA Beach Soccer World Cup (except for 2009 and 2023, when only the top two teams qualified as one of the AFC spots was automatically given to the World Cup hosts, United Arab Emirates).

Teams reaching the top four

Summary (2006-2019)

Points: W = 3 points / WE = 2 points / WP = 1 points / L = 0 points

Awards

Total Awards (2006-2019)

Team of the tournament
Since 2017, the competition's Technical Study Group have produced a post-tournament report including a dream and reserve "team of the tournament".

Appearances and performance timeline
The following is a performance timeline of the teams who have appeared in the AFC Beach Soccer Championship and how many appearances they each have made.

Legend

 – Champions
 – Runners-up
 – Third place
 – Fourth place
5th–16th – Fifth to sixteenth place

× – Did not enter
•• – Entered but withdrew
 – Hosts
Apps – No. of appearances

Timeline

Performance of qualifiers at the World Cup

The following is a performance timeline of the AFC teams who have appeared in the Beach Soccer World Cup since being sanctioned by FIFA in 2005.

Legend

 – Champions
 – Runners-up
 – Third place
 – Fourth place
 – Hosts

QF – Quarter-finals
R1 – Round 1 (group stage)
q – Qualified for upcoming tournament
Total – Total times qualified for World Cup

Notes

See also
Beach soccer at the Asian Beach Games
AFF Beach Soccer Championship
WAFF Beach Soccer Championship
AFC Futsal Asian Cup

References

External links
, the-AFC.com

 
Asian Football Confederation competitions for national teams
FIFA Beach Soccer World Cup qualification
Beach soccer competitions
Recurring sporting events established in 2006